The  is a commuter electric multiple unit (EMU) train type owned by the third-sector railway company Chiba New Town Railway and operated by the Hokuso Railway on the Hokuso Line in Japan since 1 March 2013.

Design
The design is based on the Keisei 3050 series, and is similar to the Hokuso 7500 series and Shin-Keisei N800 series trains also based on the same design.

Formation
The eight-car set is formed as shown below, with six motored (M) cars and two trailer (T) cars.

The "M1" cars each have two PT7131-B single-arm pantographs, and the "M" car has one.

Interior
The interior design is virtually identical to the Hokuso 7500 series, with passenger accommodation consisting of longitudinal bench seating throughout, although whereas the Hokuso 7500 series has three LED scrolling passenger information display units per car, the 9200 series has six 15-inch LCD screens per car, like the Keisei 3050 series, located above each doorway.

History
The sole set, 9201, was delivered to the Hokuso Line depot at Inba from the Nippon Sharyo factory in Toyokawa, Aichi in February 2013. It entered revenue service from 1 March 2013.

References

External links

 Hokuso Railway rolling stock details 

Electric multiple units of Japan
Train-related introductions in 2013

ja:北総鉄道7500形電車#千葉ニュータウン鉄道9200形
1500 V DC multiple units of Japan
Nippon Sharyo multiple units